The 1987–88 season was the 96th season in Liverpool F.C.'s existence, their 26th consecutive year in the top-flight, and covered the period from 1 July 1987 to 30 June 1988.

The squad had altered significantly from the previous season, with star striker Ian Rush now at Juventus and player-manager Kenny Dalglish concentrating largely on the manager's job, though he was still registered as a player. In Rush's place was John Aldridge, signed halfway through the previous season from Oxford United, complemented up front by £1.9 million national record signing Peter Beardsley. Following Aldridge to Anfield from Oxford was winger Ray Houghton.

Liverpool enjoyed a record 29-match unbeaten start to the season and finished as champions with just two defeats from 40 league games and a nine-point gap between them and runners-up Manchester United, sealing the top division title for a record 17th time. They were widely expected to secure a unique second double, but surprisingly lost 1–0 to underdogs Wimbledon in the FA Cup final, in which their top scorer John Aldridge missed a penalty.

Regular season
Following the departure of Ian Rush to Juventus of Italy in the summer, and the decision of player-manager Kenny Dalglish to only occasionally select himself for the first team, Liverpool had a new look attack for the 1987–88 season. Filling Rush's boots was John Aldridge, who had actually joined the club halfway through the previous season when Rush was still at Anfield. Alongside him was Peter Beardsley, the England forward signed from Newcastle United over the summer for a national record fee of £1.9 million. Another new signing was fellow England international John Barnes, the Watford winger, for £900,000.

Liverpool began the season on a winning note, beating Arsenal – who had beaten them in the previous season's League Cup final and were also among the pre-season title favourites – 2–1 at Highbury. The next league action came two weeks later at the end of August, when Steve Nicol scored twice and John Aldridge and Peter Beardsley scored the other goals in a 4–1 win at FA Cup holders Coventry City.

By the end of September, any observers who doubted John Aldridge's suitability as successor to Ian Rush were silenced as he had now scored in all of the club's opening seven league games, capped by a hat-trick in the 4–0 home win over Derby County. Liverpool were second in the table, but had two games in hand over surprise leaders Queen's Park Rangers, who had a three-point lead.

Aldridge managed to score in nine successive games for Liverpool from the start of the season, bringing his league tally to 11 goals by the time of their 4–0 win over Queen's Park Rangers at Anfield on 17 October 1987, which put the Reds back on top of the First Division on goal difference, but still with a two-game advantage over the West Londoners.

November began with the Merseyside derby at Anfield, in which Liverpool ran out 2–0 winners with goals from Steve McMahon and Peter Beardsley. Three successive draws followed, which saw Arsenal edge ahead of the Reds to the top of the table.

Liverpool's League Cup challenge came to an end in the third round when they lost 1–0 to Everton at Anfield.

Back in the league, Liverpool had returned to their winning ways and back to the top of the First Division table by the end of November, as they were now five points ahead of their nearest rivals Arsenal and had a game in hand.

Aldridge reached the 10-goal point in the league on 6 December with a penalty in the 2–1 home win over Chelsea. After a 2–2 draw at Southampton in the next game, came a six-match winning run which put the Reds 17 points ahead of their nearest challengers Nottingham Forest by 23 January 1988.

The FA Cup quest started at the Victoria Ground in early January, with the Reds being held to a disappointing goalless draw by Second Division underdogs Stoke City. A Peter Beardsley goal won the replay 1–0 at Anfield, and the next round saw the Reds cruise to a 2–0 win at Aston Villa. The fifth round brought another Merseyside derby, and the Reds took revenge for the League Cup exit by winning 1–0 at Goodison Park with a Ray Houghton goal.

Liverpool's record unbeaten start to the league season finally ended on 20 March, when they lost 1–0 at Everton in their 30th game. They still had a 14-point lead and two games in hand over nearest rivals Manchester United, however.

The wait for the league title was prolonged by a dramatic clash with Manchester United at Anfield on 4 April. After a Steve McMahon goal had put them 3–1 up in the 46th minute, a late surge by United saw the game end 3–3, but Liverpool were still 11 points ahead of Alex Ferguson's men, and had seven games left to play whereas United only had five. Even if United won all of their remaining games, Liverpool (with a vastly superior goal difference) only needed four points from their final seven games to seal the title. A goalless draw at Norwich City on 20 April effectively confirmed Liverpool as champions; they only needed heavy defeats from their final four games and United four comprehensive victories from theirs for the title to slip out of Liverpool's grasp. Three days later, Liverpool confirmed their 17th title triumph with a Peter Beardsley goal giving them a 1–0 win over Tottenham Hotspur at Anfield.

With the exception of a 5–1 win at Sheffield Wednesday in the penultimate game of the season, in which Craig Johnston scored his final two goals for Liverpool, their remaining league games of the season all ended in 1–1 draws and they finished the season with just two league defeats from 40 games and a nine-point lead over runners-up Manchester United.

Liverpool were also on a run in the FA Cup. The quarter-final had seen them triumph 4–0 over Manchester City at Maine Road, and in the semi-finals two John Aldridge goals had given them a 2–1 win over Nottingham Forest to reach the final, where they would take on Wimbledon.

Their opponents, managed by Bobby Gould and containing the likes of bullish striker John Fashanu and hard tackling midfielder Vinnie Jones, were in only their second season as a First Division club and their 11th as Football League members. The Reds were overwhelming favourites to win the final and become the first team to the double twice. But after Peter Beardsley put the ball past goalkeeper Dave Beasant but had his goal disallowed by the referee who had already awarded a free kick to Liverpool, Wimbledon took a 37th-minute lead with a goal from midfielder Lawrie Sanchez. Liverpool were far from ready to admit defeat. On the hour, Liverpool were awarded a penalty and John Aldridge took it, only for his shot to be saved by Beasant – the first penalty miss in an FA Cup final at Wembley. Liverpool continued to put pressure on the Londoners but couldn't find a way past Beasant, and when the final whistle blew Wimbledon had won the trophy in one of the biggest FA Cup upsets of all time.

Squad

Goalkeepers

  Bruce Grobbelaar
  Mike Hooper

Defenders

  Gary Ablett
  Gary Gillespie
  Alan Hansen
  Mark Lawrenson
  Steve Nicol
  Steve Staunton
  Barry Venison
  Alex Watson

Midfielders

  John Barnes
  Kenny Dalglish
  Ray Houghton
  Craig Johnston
  Kevin MacDonald
  Steve McMahon
  Mike Marsh
  Jan Mølby
  Mark Seagraves
  Nigel Spackman
  John Wark
  Ronnie Whelan

Attackers

  John Aldridge
  Peter Beardsley
  John Durnin
  Alan Irvine
  Paul Walsh

Transfers

In

Out

League table

Results

First Division

FA Cup

Final

League Cup

References
LFC History.net – Games for the 1987–88 season
Liverweb - Games for the 1987–88 season

1987-88
1988